Albert Locke was an English professional football player and manager.

Career
Locke played club football for the French teams Le Havre and Saint-Étienne.

He also managed Saint-Étienne between 1932 and 1934.

References

1898 births
Year of death missing
Association football forwards
English footballers
Le Havre AC players
AS Saint-Étienne players
Ligue 2 players
English football managers
AS Saint-Étienne managers
Expatriate football managers in France